David Stuart Wilson (13 October 1914 – 6 April 1989) was a New Zealand cricketer. He played in 25 first-class matches for Wellington from 1935 to 1949.

Wilson served in the New Zealand Army during World War Two. He was promoted to the rank of lieutenant in December 1942.

See also
 List of Wellington representative cricketers

References

External links
 

1914 births
1989 deaths
New Zealand cricketers
Wellington cricketers
Cricketers from Wellington City
North Island cricketers
New Zealand military personnel of World War II